Edward Dodsley Barrow (September 29, 1867 – December 28, 1956) was a Canadian politician.

Born in Ringwood, Hampshire, England, the son of Stephen and Sarah (Barnes) Barrow, Barrow emigrated to Chilliwack, British Columbia in 1892. A farmer, he was President of the Chilliwack Creamery Association and President of the Fraser Valley Milk Producers' Association. He served as Councillor of the Township of Chilliwack. In 1916, he was first elected to the Legislative Assembly of British Columbia as the Liberal candidate for the electoral district of Chilliwack. In 1918, he was appointed Minister of Agriculture in the cabinet of John Oliver. He died in 1956.

References

 
 

1867 births
1956 deaths
British Columbia Liberal Party MLAs
English emigrants to Canada
People from Ringwood, Hampshire
Members of the Executive Council of British Columbia